Jack Allen (born 1889), sometimes known as Walter Allen, was an English footballer who played as a right back in the Football League for Chesterfield.

Career statistics

References

English footballers
Croydon Common F.C. players
Southern Football League players
English Football League players
1889 births
Year of death unknown
Association football fullbacks
Footballers from Sheffield
Colne F.C. players
Doncaster Rovers F.C. players
People from Darnall